Friendly Persuasion may refer to:
The Friendly Persuasion, a 1945 novel by Jessamyn West
Friendly Persuasion (1956 film), based on the book
"Friendly Persuasion" (song), a popular song from the movie
Friendly Persuasion (1975 film), a made-for-TV movie based on the book and its sequel